Scio Diamond Technology Corporation is a synthetic diamond manufacturer that produces near flawless single-crystal diamonds for gemstone and industrial applications, in Greenville, South Carolina.  The company produces chemical vapor deposition (CVD) gem-sized synthetic diamond crystals using processes pioneered by Apollo Diamond, and has acquired Apollo Diamond's technology and assets including several U.S. patents on the processes.

Products 

Scio's so-called "cultured diamonds", or synthetic diamonds, although not of natural origin, are real diamonds, and thus they have the same physical and optical properties as diamonds formed by geological processes.  The company's controlled manufacturing processes enables it to produce very high-quality, high-purity, high volume, single-crystal colorless, near colorless and fancy colored diamonds to suit a variety of industrial and gemstone applications.

Synthetic diamonds are often viewed as "green" as they are not mined, avoiding the controversy surrounding blood diamonds by ensuring ethical sourcing that does not finance war or violence.

Alleged fraud and embezzlement 
In 2017, the United States Department of Justice announced the indictment of Edward S. Adams, the chairman of the board of directors of the company, with "orchestrating an elaborate fraud scheme to embezzle millions of dollars of investors' funds."

Delisting 
In August of 2019, the stock (under symbol SCIO) was delisted by the SEC after the company failed to file any financial reports for over two years.

See also 
 List of synthetic diamond manufacturers

References

External links 
 

Synthetic diamond